John Stevens (born 1769 at South Ockendon, Essex; died 13 January 1863 at Hornchurch, Essex) was an English amateur cricketer who made 17 known appearances in first-class cricket matches from 1789 to 1799.

Career
He was mainly associated with Essex.

References

External sources
 CricketArchive record

1769 births
1863 deaths
English cricketers
English cricketers of 1787 to 1825
Essex cricketers
Hornchurch Cricket Club cricketers